A federal building houses local offices of government departments and agencies in countries with a federal system.

Federal Building may also refer to:

United States
 Federal Building, Ketchikan, Alaska
 Federal Building (Little Rock, Arkansas)
 Federal Building (Sacramento), California
 Federal Building (Colorado Springs, Colorado)
 Federal Building, U.S. Courthouse, Downtown Postal Station in Tampa, Florida
 Federal Building, United States Post Office and Courthouse (Hilo, Hawaii)
 Federal Building (Ruston, Louisiana)
 Federal Building (Flint, Michigan)
 Federal Building (Port Huron, Michigan)
 Federal Building, Grand Island, Nebraska
 Federal Building (Laconia, New Hampshire)
 Federal Building (Raleigh, North Carolina)
 Federal Building (Wilkesboro, North Carolina)
 Federal Building (Gettysburg, Pennsylvania)
 Federal Building (Providence, Rhode Island)
 Federal Building (Milwaukee, Wisconsin)

Elsewhere
 Federal Building, Edmonton, Alberta, Canada

See also 
 Federal Courts Building (disambiguation)
 Federal Office Building (disambiguation)